The rufous-backed thrush (Turdus rufopalliatus) is a songbird of the thrush family. It is endemic to the Pacific slope of Mexico. It is also known as the rufous-backed robin.

Description
It is named for the adult's rufous or olive-rufous upper back, which contrasts with the grayish head, nape, and rump. The chest and flanks are also rufous. The belly and undertail coverts are white; the throat is white with many black streaks. The bill and eye-ring are yellow. Females are typically somewhat duller-colored than males. Juveniles, like other juvenile Turdus thrushes, are spotted below; they are browner and have pale flecks above.

The subspecies of the Islas Tres Marías, also found around San Blas, Nayarit, is sometimes considered a separate species, Grayson's robin or Grayson's thrush, Turdus graysoni (Ridgway, 1882).  It looks "washed out", with little rufous tinting.

The song is slow and warbling, with repetition of phrases.  An example is "weedele loo loo freerlii..."  The alarm call is a long, mellow, descending whistle, "cheeoo or teeeuu".  Other calls resemble those of the American robin; the flight call is thinner.

Range and habitat
The rufous-backed robin inhabits dry deciduous forests, including the edges, and in human-planted habitats, at heights from the ground to high in trees. Its main range extends from southeastern Sonora to the southeastern corner of Oaxaca along the coast and in the Río Balsas drainage. The isolated populations in Mexico City and Oaxaca City are probably descended from escaped cage birds. A number of vagrants have reached the Mexican-border states of the United States, where they are often found in riparian woods.

Behavior
This species is shyer than the American robin. In winter it often forms flocks. The diet is typical of thrushes: fruit and invertebrates, especially insects. Reproduction resembles that of other Turdus species. The eggs are whitish with heavy red-brown markings. In regard to nesting, nests are usually made of plant material mixed with mud, found in trees and shrubs, and can hold about 2-3 nestlings  One of the parents tends to build the nest, while both sexes care for the nestlings and defend the nest territory.

References

Turdus
Endemic birds of Mexico
Thrush, Rufous-backed
Birds of the Sierra Madre Occidental
Birds of the Sierra Madre del Sur
Birds of the Trans-Mexican Volcanic Belt
Fauna of Islas Marías
Natural history of Colima
Natural history of Nayarit
Natural history of Oaxaca
Natural history of Sonora
Birds described in 1840